Abbas Alizadeh (born 1951) is an Iranologist and Persian archaeologist. Alizadeh is a senior research associate at the Oriental Institute of The University of Chicago, who works with the Iranian Prehistoric Project. He has supervised foreign teams of archaeologists working throughout Iran.

He is known for his investigations of Chogha Bonut.

References 

Excavations at the Prehistoric Mound of Chogha Bonut, Khuzestan, Iran, Seasons 1976/77, 1977/78, and 1996 - by Abbas Alizadeh, with contributions by N. F. Miller, A. M. Rosen, and R. W. Redding

External links
 Iranian Prehistoric Project

Iranian archaeologists
American Iranologists
Iranian Iranologists
American people of Iranian descent
Living people
1951 births